William Gordon Rufus Vanderspar (born 6 October 1991) is an English cricketer who played for Leeds/Bradford MCCU and Middlesex 2nd XI.  He is a right-handed batsman and right arm fast bowler. He enjoyed a prolific school career at Eton College and he was named 2011 Young Wisden Schools Cricketer of the Year. He made his first-class debut for Leeds/Bradford MCCU against Yorkshire, on 5 April 2013.

He is captain of the Eton Ramblers team in the Cricketer Cup, and holder of the highest score made for that team in that competition - 169 not out - against the Old Bedfordians.

References

External links
 
 

1991 births
Living people
People from Camden Town
English cricketers
People educated at Eton College
Leeds/Bradford MCCU cricketers
Marylebone Cricket Club cricketers